Watermael-Boitsfort or Watermaal-Bosvoorde is a residential suburb of the city of Brussels in Belgium, and one of the 19 municipalities which form the Brussels-Capital Region.

It borders the municipalities of Uccle, Auderghem and Ixelles as well as the province of Flemish Brabant. In 2006 the municipality had a total population of 24,056. In common with all of Brussels' municipalities, it is legally bilingual (French–Dutch).

History

The modern-day municipality of Watermael-Boitsfort was originally two separate settlements located on a plain between the two small rivers of Woluwe and Watermaelbeek to the north of the Sonian Forest. The earliest evidence of human activity in the region are the remains of a small fortified neolithic village of the Michelsberg culture, dating to between 3500 and 2500 BC.

The earliest mention of the name Watermael is in a document of 914 bequeathing an estate of the name to a French abbey. Originally part of the estate of Watermael, Boitfort became separate after a hunting lodge, on a site adjacent to the forest, was given to the Boutsvoord family by the Duchy of Brabant in the 13th century. During the Middle Ages, inhabitants of the two settlements farmed and raised cattle and a number of hunting lodges on the edge of the forest were built for members of the nobility. The construction of a road to the city of Brussels, to the north, through Boitsfort led to the rapid expansion of both settlements. The population of Watermael rose from 349 inhabitants in 1709 to 826 in 1800.

Watermael-Boitsfort was created in 1811 during the period of French rule when the two municipalities were merged. Although several industries grew in the area during the 19th century, Watermael-Boitsfort remained largely agrarian and increasingly residential, especially after the municipality was linked to Brussels by railway in 1854. It soon became a fashionable, bourgeois neighbourhood. Originally Dutch was the dominant language, but French became dominant after 1920. During the 1920s, two garden cities (cité-jardins), Le Logis and Floréal, were built. The municipality's population hit an all-time peak of 25,138 inhabitants in 1970.

One of Watermael-Boitsfort's first mayors was the liberal Pierre-Théodore Verhaegen, known for his role in the creation of the Free University of Brussels, who held the post between 1825 and 1842.

Notable historic buildings in the municipality include the Church of St. Clement of which parts date to the 11th century.

Economy and demographics

Watermael-Boitsfort is one of Brussels' wealthiest municipalities. In 2002, the average per capita income was 30,100 euros; over 600 euros higher than the average for the Brussels-Capital Region as a whole. 16 percent of its inhabitants were not Belgian citizens; lower than the Brussels average.

Since 2000, the municipal government is dominated by the liberal Mouvement Réformateur, regionalist DéFI (formerly FDF), and green Ecolo parties. The current bourgmestre (mayor) is Olivier Deleuze of Ecolo.

There are two railway stations located within the municipality, Watermael railway station and Boitsfort railway station, both of which are located on railway line 161.

The International School of Brussels (ISB), founded in 1951, is located in Watermael-Boitsfort.

Remarkable buildings 
Watermael-Boitsfort regroups many remarkable buildings and former grand country houses.
 Chateau Tournay-Solvay, former house of Alfred Solvay
 Château de Jolimont, residence of among others the painter Jacques d'Arthois
 Château Bischoffsheim, housing the International School of Brussels
 Château Charle-Albert; former house of Belgian Prime Minister Paul van Zeeland
 Château Morel
 Château des Fougères; now part of a luxury condominium complex

Sport 
Boitsfort is home to Boitsfort Rugby Club, one of Belgium's most successful Rugby Union teams. It is also home to football team Royal Racing Club de Boitsfort.

The  was a horse-racing course, built in 1875 but is no longer used as such. Since 1987, the centre of the course has been occupied by the Brussels Golf Club, which has a nine-hole course, and the former horse racing track is used by runners, bikers and dog-walkers. It frequently acts as the starting point and finish line for local 10 km runs. In 2016, the park, rebranded as DROHME with new investors, saw major renovations of the bleachers (la tribune in French) and the jockey-weighing station, which in September 2018 reopened as a brasserie.

Politics
The current city council was elected in the October 2018 elections.

Notable inhabitants
Notable people who have lived or worked in Watermael-Boitsfort include:
Rik Wouters, artist and sculptor.
Paul Delvaux, artist. Delvaux painted Watermael station on a number of occasions.
Auguste Beernaert, politician and Nobel Peace Prize winner who served as Prime Minister of Belgium between 1884 and 1894.
Hergé, comic artist and creator of The Adventures of Tintin.
Omer Coppens, impressionist artist
Willy Coppens, Belgian flying ace of World War I

Twin cities

The municipality is twinned with:
 Chantilly
 Annan
 Hegyvidék

References

Citations

Bibliography

External links

 Official website of Watermael-Boitsfort
 Watermael-Boitsfort at Patrimoine.brussels

 
Municipalities of the Brussels-Capital Region
Populated places in Belgium